Bethesda Christian School may refer to:
 Bethesda Christian School (Brownsburg, Indiana), a private school in Brownsburg, Indiana, U.S.A
 Bethesda Christian School (Fort Worth, Texas), a Christian school located in Fort Worth, Texas